Suyt'uqucha (Quechua suyt'u, sayt'u rectangular, qucha lake, lagoon, "rectangular lake", hispanicized spelling Suitococha, Suito) is a lake in Peru located in the Puno Region, Lampa Province, Santa Lucía District. Suyt'uqucha lies south of the larger lake named Ananta.

See also
List of lakes in Peru

References

Lakes of Peru
Lakes of Puno Region